Kartal Cemevi is a cemevi of Alevi Moslems located in Kartal district of Istanbul.

Kartal Cemevi Foundation is created as "Kartal Cemevi Culture, Education and Social Assistance Association" since 1993. The land of the Cemevi is requested by Kartal's mayor Mehmet Ali Büklü.

The architecture of the building is designed by Gökçe Gencay.

Since 1996, the association is turned into a foundation.

References

Alevism
Islamic organizations based in Turkey